Chaffey, created in 1936, is a single-member electoral district for the South Australian House of Assembly. It covers the Riverland region of South Australia including the towns of Renmark, Berri, Barmera, Loxton and Waikerie. The seat is named after brothers George and William Chaffey who established the irrigation area along the Murray River from 1886.

Chaffey spent most of the Playmander era in the hands of independent William MacGillivray. The Liberal and Country League did not win it until 1956. Chaffey was won three times by Labor's Reg Curren as their most marginal electorate on a two-party-preferred basis – in 1962 on 50.1%, 1965 on 50.7% and 1970 on 50.2%. Curren's 1965 victory helped put Labor in government in 1965 after 33 years in opposition, while his loss to the LCL's Peter Arnold was one of two Labor losses that returned the LCL to government in 1968. Curren reclaimed it for Labor during his party's 1970 landslide victory after the end of the Playmander, only to lose it back to Arnold in 1973. At the 1975 election, Arnold picked up a massive 13.5 percent swing, and Labor has never come close to winning it since. Chaffey was one of several rural electorates where Labor suffered large swings in 1975; Labor suffered a swing of 15.5 percent in Mount Gambier and a 16.4 percent in Millicent.

Chaffey remained in the hands of the LCL and its successor, the Liberal Party, until 1997 when Karlene Maywald narrowly won it for the SA Nationals.  Maywald picked up a large swing in 2002, boosting her two-candidate preferred vote to 64 percent.  She held the electorate without serious difficulty until she was defeated in 2010 by Liberal Tim Whetstone, who still holds the seat.

Members for Chaffey

Election results

Notes

References
 ECSA profile for Chaffey: 2018
 ABC profile for Chaffey: 2018
 Poll Bludger profile for Chaffey: 2018

Electoral districts of South Australia
Riverland
1938 establishments in Australia